Bleichert, short for Adolf Bleichert & Co., was a German engineering firm founded in 1874 by Adolf Bleichert. The company dominated the aerial wire ropeway industry during the first half of the 20th century, and its portfolio included cranes, electric cars, elevators, and mining and ship-loading equipment. It ceased operations in 1993.

History

1874 until 1918 
In 1872, Adolf Bleichert started the design and manufacture of the first wire ropeway, also known as the aerial lift, in Teutschenthal (Saxony, Germany). With the successful start-up of this installation, Adolf Bleichert and Theodor Otto founded a company for the manufacture of wire ropeways in 1874 in Gohlis, near Leipzig. This was the beginning of Adolf Bleichert & Co. which in 50 years, developed into a world-renowned company of the highest standing. 
In 1881, Bleichert moved its offices to Leipzig-Gohlis, which became the main factory facility located in a much bigger plant and was also the company headquarters.

Starting in 1888, Bleichert also expanded into the North American market by concluding a license agreement with the American company Cooper, Hewitt & Co., the parent company of Trenton Iron Inc., which constructed and sold many material wire ropeways based on the Bleichert system.

During World War I, the Bleichert company developed a specific field cable car used by German military forces in mountain warfare in the Vosges Mountains, the Alps, and Balkan areas.
Until World War I the Bleichert company manufactured many aerial cable cars especially for material carriage, but also for passenger transportation. Among them are the following:
 1874: Aerial cableway installation on round bar rails for the solar oil and paraffin factory in Teutschenthal near Halle, Germany
 1876: Ropeway conveyor for the material transportation of Sayn Mine Works from the Krupp company near Bendorf, Germany
 1880: Aerial cableway for the transportation of iron ore from theDoihl Mineto the steelworks in Rodange, Luxembourg
 1890: Aerial cableway for wood transportation in the Baina-Buschta region, Serbia
 1900: Aerial cableway for the mines of the Kappler Tunnel on the Schauinsland mountain in the Black Forest near Freiburg im Breisgau, Germany
 1902: Aerial cableway for coal-mining activities at Grand-Hornu, Belgium
 1903: Aerial cableway for coal-mining activities at the Sumitomo-Besshi Copper Mine in Niihama, Japan
 1904: Aerial cableway for the former mining company Harpener Bergbau AG near Dortmund, Germany
 1905: Aerial cableway for the Chilecito-La Mejicana gold mining industry, also known as the cable car from the Famatina pit, Argentina
 1906: Aerial cableway for the nickel ore loading facility of Société Le Nickel on the pacific coast of the French overseas territory of Thio, New Caledonia
 1906: Aerial cableway for the cement industry for Alsenschen Portland-Zementfabrik in Itzehoe–Agethorst/Wacken, Germany
 1908: Aerial cableway for the coal-mining industry in Longyearbyen, Spitsbergen (Svalbard islands), Norway
 1909: Aerial cableway for wood transportation of a sawmill in Mkumbara – Neu Hornow, former German East Africa
 1909: Aerial cableway for material transportation at Toli Mines in the coal-mining district of Shandong coastal province, China
 1913: Passenger aerial cableway (Kohlerer Bahn) in Bolzano, South Tyrol (former Austria-Hungary), Italy
 1913: Aerial cable cranes for the construction of the Centennial Hall in Wroclaw (Lower Silesia), Poland

1918 until 1945 
Bleichert mainly built material-carrying wire ropeways, but then diversified into passenger cable cars as well, such as the famous Predigtstuhl Aerial Tramway in the Alps, the Tyrolean Zugspitze Cable Car, Krossobanen in Norway, Table Mountain Aerial Cableway in South Africa, Burgberg Cable Car in Germany, Aeri de Montserrat in Catalunya and the Port Vell Aerial Tramway crossing the Port of Barcelona from Torre Sant Sebastia via Torre Jaume I to Montjuïc.

By the company’s 50th anniversary in 1924, Adolf Bleichert & Co. had designed and built the world's record-holding wire ropeways: longest and highest elevation (Argentina), length of system over water (New Caledonia), steepest (Tanzania), highest capacity (France), northernmost (Norway), and southernmost (Chile).

In 1926, the company went public, though it was controlled by Bleichert’s two sons, Max and Paul von Bleichert. Due to the Great Depression and the collapse of the German banking system, on 4 April 1932 Bleichert & Co. filed for bankruptcy. No longer under Bleichert family control, the  factory continued to produce during World War II.

From 1945 
In 1954, SAG Bleichert was transferred to the German Democratic Republic (East Germany), and was renamed VEB Bleichert. Soon thereafter, the firm was continued under the name  Leipzig. Between 1962 and 1985, this entity went through several iterations. However, by 1991, the company had been privatized and entered liquidation, halting production of cranes, conveyance, and pit mining equipment — thus concluding the history of the oldest and largest wire ropeway manufacturer of the world.

Further reading 
 Dr. Manfred Hötzel; Stefan W. Krieg:  An entrepreneur's biography, industrial architecture and company history. (=Gohliser Historische Hefte, Bd. 8), Sax Verlag, Beucha 2007, .
 Dr. Peter von Bleichert: Adolf Bleichert & Co.'s Wire Rope Systems, KDP, 2019
 Oliver Werner:  (=Beiträge zur Wirtschafts- und Sozialgeschichte, Nr. 101), Steiner, Stuttgart 2004, 
 P. Stephan:  Verlag von Julius Springer, Berlin 1914 (Digitalisat)

External links 
 Family and company website: Bleichert & Co. - The Wire Ropeway Dynasty
Leipzig Lese: Adolf Bleichert und sein Werk

References 

Engineering companies of Germany
Companies established in 1874
1874 establishments in Germany
Manufacturing companies based in Leipzig
Aerial lift manufacturers
Defunct motor vehicle manufacturers of Germany
Electric vehicle manufacturers of Germany
Crane manufacturers
Construction equipment manufacturers of Germany
Sustainable transport pioneers